The Hunter House, located at 118 W. Walnut St. in Leitchfield, Kentucky, was built in c.1886.  It was listed on the National Register of Historic Places in 1985.

It is a three-story, three-bay, clapboard house with a wraparound porch and a three-story, round tower.  The tower is topped by a conical turret with two half-circle eyebrow windows.

References

Houses on the National Register of Historic Places in Kentucky
Queen Anne architecture in Kentucky
Houses completed in 1886
National Register of Historic Places in Grayson County, Kentucky
1886 establishments in Kentucky
Leitchfield, Kentucky